In economics, abnormal profit, also called excess profit, supernormal profit or pure profit, is "profit of a firm over and above what provides its owners with a normal (market equilibrium) return to capital." Normal profit (return) in turn is defined as opportunity cost of the owner's resources. A related broader term is economic rent, which applies to the owner of a resource, such as land, rather than to the firm as such.

According to the theoretical model of perfect competition, abnormal profits are unsustainable because they stimulate new supply, which forces down prices and eliminates the abnormal profit. Abnormal profit persists in the long run in imperfectly competitive markets where firms successfully block the entry of new firms. Abnormal profit is usually generated by an oligopoly or a monopoly; however, firms often try to hide this fact, both from the market and government, in order to reduce the chance of competition, or government intervention in the form of an antitrust investigation.

In principle, there are three kinds of abnormal profit:
Monopoly profit
Resource rent
Intramarginal rent.

Business writer Michael Porter and Anita M. McGahan undertook an empirical study of the "emergence and sustainability of abnormal profits" in 2003, in which they concluded that both industry structure and firm performance were determinants of whether abnormal profits could be sustained by firms.

See also
Economic rent
War profiteering
Windfall profits
Excess profits tax

References

Profit
Monopoly (economics)